Hypacostemma is a genus of leafhoppers in the subfamily Deltocephalinae. It is the only genus in the tribe Hypacostemmini. Hypacostemma contains at least 5 described species distributed throughout Southern Africa. Hypacostemma are usually large greenish leafhoppers with a length between 7-10 mm.

Species 
There are currently 5 described species in Hypacostemma:

 Hypacostemma brevis 
 Hypacostemma devia 
 Hypacostemma falcata 
 Hypacostemma uniformis 
 Hypacostemma viridissima

References 

Deltocephalinae
Fauna of Southern Africa